The Myers House is a historic house at 221 St. Andrew's Terrace in West Helena, Arkansas.  It is a two-story wood frame and brick house with a hip roof pierced on three sides by broad hip-roof dormers.  Built c. 1920, it represents an excellent local synthesis of Craftsman and Prairie School styling.

The house was listed on the National Register of Historic Places in 1996.

See also
National Register of Historic Places listings in Phillips County, Arkansas

References

Houses on the National Register of Historic Places in Arkansas
Prairie School architecture in Arkansas
Houses completed in 1920
Houses in Phillips County, Arkansas
National Register of Historic Places in Phillips County, Arkansas